Nabil Shehata (born 1980) is a German-Egyptian conductor and double bass soloist. In 2019 he became conductor and artistic director of the Philharmonie Südwestfalen.

Biography 
Nabil Shehata began his career as a conductor in 2006, and has enjoyed the benefit of support and mentorship of Daniel Barenboim, Rolf Reuter, Lawrence Foster und Christian Thielemann. Shehata made his conducting debut in Cottbus in 2007. That same year Shehata made his first international appearance conducting the Simon Bolivar Orchestra in Venezuela followed by a broadening conducting career, including guest engagements with the New Japan Philharmonic Orchestra, Kioi Sinfonietta, Orchestre National du Capitole de Toulouse, Düsseldorfer Symphoniker, Dresdner Philharmoniker, Rundfunk-Sinfonieorchester Berlin, Deutsche Staatsphilharmonie, Stuttgarter Philharmoniker, Münchner Rundfunkorchester and the Philharmonisches Orchester Luxemburg.
 
During his tenure as chief conductor at the Kammeroper München (2011 - 2019) he led several new opera productions and conducted concerts with singers like Waltraud Meier, Okka von der Damerau, and Robert Gambill.

In 2019, Shehata was appointed to the current position as chief conductor of the Philharmonie Südwestfalen

At the age of six, Nabil Shehata began studying the piano under the guidance of his mother. By the age of nine he started double bass lessons with Thomas Zscherpe. He studied at the Hochschule für Musik Würzburg with Michinori Bunya and subsequently under Esko Laine at the Hochschule für Musik „Hanns Eisler“ in Berlin. While still a student, Shehata won an audition for the principal double bass position at the Staatskapelle Berlin. In 2004, he was appointed principal double bassist of the Berlin Philharmonic, a position he left in 2008 to pursue his conducting career.

Awards 
 2021: Preis der deutschen Schallplattenkritik (German Record Critics’ Award), in the category „Crossover Productions“
 2018: Opus-Klassik Award for Chamber Music Recording (20th/21st Century Music)
 2014: Grand Prize Winner of the Washington Award of the S&R Foundation
 2006: Prätorius Förderpreis (Music Prize) of the State of Lower Saxony
 2003: First Prize and Audience Award at the ARD International Music Competition Munich.

Reviews 
 BBC Music Magazine Choice – December 2021: Orchestral Choice: Saint-Saëns: Cello Concerto, Bacchanale & Symphony No. 1. Astrig Siranossian (cello), Philharmonie Südwestfalen, Nabil Shehata. Chris O'Reilly in Prestomusic 23rd November 2021
 „Saint-Saëns: Cello-Konzert Nr. 1, Sinfonie Nr. 1, Bacchanale; Astrig Siranossian, cello, Philharmonie Südwestfalen, Nabil Shehata“. Guido Fischer in Rondo – Das Klassik- & Jazz-Magazin 16.10.2021
 „Beseelte Rhetorik für Saint-Saëns“. „Camille Saint-Saëns: Cellokonzert Nr. 1 | Symphonie Nr. 1 | Bacchanale aus Samson & Dalila op. 47; Astrig Siranossian, cello, Philharmonie Südwestfalen, Nabil Shehata“. Alpha. Remy Frank in the „Pizzicato“ Journal for Classical Music 01.10.2021
 „Works for Double Bass and Piano". Nabil Shehata (double bass), Karim Shehata (piano) Genuin. Gero Schreier in “Das Orchester” 6/2017

Discography 
 Camille Saint-Saëns. Cellokonzert Nr. 1 | Symphonie Nr. 1 | Bacchanale aus Samson & Dalila op. 47; Astrig Siranossian (Cello); Philharmonie Südwestfalen; Nabil Shehata. Alpha 2021
 Identigration. Bridges-Kammerorchester. Shehata. Mayrhofer u.a.hr 2021
 Schubert. Mozart. Beethoven: PhilSW in Concert. Philharmonie Südwestfalen. Nabil Shehata. Blu-ray Disc. 2020
 Brahms, Bruch, Glière, Koussevitsky. Werke für Kontrabass und Klavier. Nabil Shehata (Kontrabass), Karim Shehata (Klavier). Genuin 2017
 Mieczyslav Weinberg: Sonate für Kontrabass. Nabil Shehata. CPO 2014
 Gioachino Rossini: Fantasia by Bottesini. Kyril Zlotnikov (Cello), Nabil Shehata (Kontrabass), West-Eastern Divan Orchestra, Daniel Barenboim. Eurokrats 2006
 Harald Genzmer: Musik für Violoncello, Kontrabass und Klavier. Martin Ostertag (Cello), Nabil Shehata (Kontrabass), Oliver Triendl (Klavier). Bella Musical 2005.
 George Onslow. Quintet Op. 81 | Sextet Op. 30. Maálot Quintett. Markus Becker | Nabil Shehata. MDG 2018

References

External links 
 
 Porträt Nabil Shehata "Ganz oder gar nicht"

1980 births
Living people
21st-century German conductors (music)
German male conductors (music)
German classical double-bassists
Male double-bassists
German people of Egyptian descent